Limbella fryei, or Frye's limbella moss, is a species of moss in the family Amblystegiaceae. It is endemic to the United States. It is believed to occur in Oregon.
As the species is threatened by habitat loss while only occurring in a very restricted area (less than 10 km2), it has been classified as critically endangered by the IUCN.

References

USDA Forest Service Species Fact Sheet

Hypnales
Endemic flora of the United States
Critically endangered plants
Bryophyta of North America
Taxonomy articles created by Polbot

Flora of Oregon
Endemic flora of Oregon